Siding Spring may refer to:
 Siding Spring Observatory, an astronomical observatory in Australia
 Siding Spring 2.3 m Telescope, the telescope at Siding Spring Observatory
 Siding Spring Survey, a near-Earth object search program
 2343 Siding Spring, an asteroid from the main asteroid belt
 Comet Siding Spring (disambiguation), a number of different comets